Christianity is the largest religion in Rwanda. The most recent national census from 2012 indicates that: 43.7% of Rwanda's population is Roman Catholic, 37.7% is Protestant, 11.8% is Seventh-day Adventist, 2.0% is Muslim (mainly Sunni), 2.5% claims no religious affiliation, and 0.7% is Jehovah's Witness.

There is also a small population of Baha'is, as well as some practising traditional indigenous beliefs. There has been a proliferation of small, usually Christian-linked schismatic religious groups since the 1994 genocide.

There are small and secretive communities of Hindus and Buddhists, comprising mostly foreign adherents, typically businessmen from China and India as well as university professors and students. Neither religion seriously attempts conversion in Rwanda; although, there is a Hindu Temple of Rwanda as a place of worship.

Current context
Foreign missionaries and church-linked nongovernmental organizations (NGOs) of various religious groups operate in the country. Foreign missionaries openly promote their religious beliefs, and the Government welcomes their development assistance.

The Constitution of Rwanda provides for freedom of religion, and the Government generally respects this right in practice. Local government officials sometimes detain Jehovah's Witnesses for refusing to participate in security patrols. In 2007, the US government received no reports of societal abuses or discrimination based on religious belief or practice.

History

Role of religion in 1994 genocide

An estimated 800,000 Rwandans died during ethnic violence over a brief span of 100 days between April and July 1994. Most of the dead were Tutsis, and most of those who perpetrated the violence were Hutus.

The genocide started after the death of the Rwandan President Juvénal Habyarimana, a Hutu, in the shooting down of his plane above Kigali airport on 6 April 1994. The full details of that specific incident remain unclear; however, the death of the president was by no means the only cause of the mayhem. (Ethnic tension in Rwanda is not new. Disagreements between the majority Hutus and minority Tutsis are common, but the animosity between them grew substantially after the end of the Belgian colonial regime.)

Timothy Longman has provided the most detailed discussion of the role of religion in the Rwandan genocide in Christianity and Genocide in Rwanda, published in 2010.
Longman argues that both Catholic and Protestant churches helped to make the genocide possible by giving moral sanction to the killing. Churches had longed played ethnic politics themselves, favoring the Tutsi during the colonial period then switching allegiance to the Hutu after 1959, sending a message that some may have interpreted as ethnic discrimination being consistent with church teaching. The church leaders had close ties with the political leaders, and after the genocide began, the church leaders called on the population to support the new interim government, the very government supporting the genocide.

Some church leaders actively participated in the genocide. For example, Athanase Seromba, a Catholic priest responsible at the time of the genocide for the Nyange parish, was ultimately (after appeal) convicted in 2008 by the Appeals Chamber for the International Criminal Tribunal for Rwanda of committing genocide and crimes against humanity. Specifically, it was shown that Seromba abused his high degree of trust in the community as a Catholic priest, when, instead of protecting the 1500-2000 Tutsi refugees sheltering in his church, he provided key and necessary approval for the church to be bulldozed to the ground with the intent to kill the refugees inside.

At the same time, churches did not uniformly support the genocide. In the period leading up to the genocide, 1990–1994, major splits emerged within most churches between moderates who promoted democratic change and conservatives allied with the Habyarimana regime. Many of the clergy were Tutsi, and they generally supported democratic reform, but many moderate Hutu within the churches supported reform as well. Churches provided major support to the formation of the new human-rights groups that emerged in the early 1990s. When the genocide began in 1994, some clergy and other church leaders opposed the violence,
even at the risk of their own lives.

Some individual members of the religious community attempted to protect civilians, sometimes at great risk to themselves.  For example, Mgr.  of Cyangugu preached against the genocide from the pulpit and tried unsuccessfully to rescue three Tutsi religious brothers from an attack, while Sr. Felicitas Niyitegeka of the Auxiliaires de l’Apostolat in Gisenyi smuggled Tutsi across the border into Zaire before a militant militia executed her in retaliation.

In her book Left to Tell: Discovering God in the Rwandan Holocaust (2006), Immaculée Ilibagiza, a Tutsi woman, describes hiding with seven other Tutsi women for 91 days in a bathroom in the house of Pastor Murinzi - for the majority of the genocide. At the St Paul Pastoral Centre in Kigali about 2,000 people found refuge and most of them survived, due to the efforts of Fr Célestin Hakizimana. This priest "intervened at every attempt by the militia to abduct or murder" the refugees in his centre.  In the face of powerful opposition, he tried to hold off the killers with persuasion or bribes.

On November 20, 2016, the Catholic Church in Rwanda released a statement signed by nine bishops apologizing for the role of its members in the genocide of 1994.

See also
Roman Catholicism in Rwanda
Islam in Rwanda
Protestant Council of Rwanda

References

External links
 "Rwanda's resurrection of faith" by Mary Wiltenburg, The Christian Science Monitor, April 12, 2004
  "Rwanda: How the genocide happened", BBC News, December 18, 2008
  "For Rwandans, the pope's apology must be unbearable", The Guardian, March 28, 2010